The Japan Automotive Hall of Fame (or JAHFA) is based at the National Museum of Nature and Science in Tokyo, Japan. It was established in 2000 and, since 2001, five or six people have been inducted in an annual award ceremony held at the museum.

With plans to involve other museums (as in Kumamoto, where a dedicated display was opened), the Japanese Automotive Hall of Fame (a registered NPO) serves a useful role by informing people of the outstanding achievements made over the years by the motor industry pioneers and their successors. Of even greater importance, it is intended to inspire the next generation.

Inductees

2001 
 Kiichiro Toyoda: founder of Toyota and Toyoda Machinery
Born in 1894, after completing his education at Tokyo Imperial University, Toyoda joined the family business – the Toyoda Spinning & Weaving Co. in Aiichi Prefecture. Eventually, in the 1930s, he established a car-building factory, and the Toyota brand was born as a result. Toyota was originally Toyoda.  When Toyoda was changed to Toyota Motors, one part of the company still kept the Toyoda name (Toyoda Machinery) which still exists today selling Machine Tools. He died in March 1952. 
 Soichiro Honda: founder of Honda
Born in November 1906, Honda worked at a car repair firm in Tokyo before establishing his own workshop in 1928. The Honda marque was established in October 1946, starting with motorcycles before moving into the automotive field. The brand also became synonymous with racing on two and four wheels. Honda died in 1991. 
 Takeo Fujisawa: business manager of Honda
Born in 1910, Fujisawa joined Honda in 1949 and looked after the business aspect of the brand. He died in 1988.
 Jiro Yanase: Car importer of merit
Yanase was born in 1916 in Tokyo, joining his father's company Yanase Co., Ltd., in 1939. Yanase was a trailblazer in dealing in imported cars in Japan, introducing several brands to the country. Yanase was inducted to the Automotive Hall of Fame in North America in 2004.
 Osamu Hirao: Scholar/Doctor of Engineering
Born in 1915, Hirao graduated from Tokyo Imperial University in 1939. He became a professor in 1954, working to improve all aspects of the motor industry (he had over 200 theses published), and a Fellow of the SAE in 1977. He died in July 1995.
 Shojiro Ishibashi: founder of Bridgestone
Born in 1889, Ishibashi came from a family of 'tabi' (traditional Japanese socks) manufacturers. These evolved into working shoes with rubber soles, and the use of rubber was duly expanded into several fields. The decision to make car tyres was taken with the foundation of Bridgestone Tyres in 1931, which became world-famous over the ensuing years. Ishibashi (which translates into Stone Bridge) died in 1976.

2002 
 Osamu Suzuki: president of Suzuki
Born in 1930, Mr Suzuki was appointed president of Suzuki in 1978 at the age of 48. He has received numerous awards from countries outside Japan where Suzuki has established factories making light vehicles. In 2000, Suzuki was promoted to the position of chairman of the company.
 Kazuo Kumabe: vice-president of Toyota
Born in 1897, Kumabe studied mechanics at Tokyo Imperial University, and conducted a great deal of research in thermal conduction and internal combustion engines. He wrote a book on the latter which became the standard source of reference in Japan. After the war, he was appointed MD of Toyota, but left in the early 1950s to form Kumabe Research. He died in 1974.
 Junya Toyokawa: founder of Hakuyosha/Otomo
Born in 1886, Toyokawa entered the Tokyo Institute of Technology in 1907 but soon left, displeased with the style of education. He traveled to the US in 1913, and upon returning to Japan in 1915, began researching and building internal combustion engines. He built two prototype vehicles in 1921, providing the foundation for the Otomo car of 1922. Although the Otomo was Japan's first exported car, the marque disappeared after around 300 machines were built, as it was unable to compete with locally-built Ford and GM products. 
 Masujiro Hashimoto: founder of Kaishinsha/DAT
Born in 1874, Hashimoto went to the States after graduating from the Tokyo Institute of Technology, and worked at a steam locomotive factory. However, whilst in the US he met Henry Leland. Inspired by Leland's work, Hashimoto established the Kaishinsha Automobile Factory, which duly provided the building block for the Datsun brand. Hashimoto died in 1944.
 Kunimitsu Takahashi: Racing driver and motorcyclist
Born in 1940, Takahashi started his racing career on two wheels, becoming a works rider with the Honda team. After a bad crash in the 1962 Isle of Man TT race, he turned to four wheels, racing for Nissan and Honda with a great deal of success, competing at the top level until 1999. He is still heavily involved in motorsport promotion.

2003 
 Tsuneji Matsuda: president of Mazda
Born in Osaka in 1895, Matsuda joined Toyo Kogyo (forerunner of Mazda) in 1927, and became a director in 1938. Matsuda ultimately became Mazda's president in 1951, with the company thriving under his vision and leadership. He also brought the rotary engine to Mazda, giving his engineers to freedom to make it work while 100 or so firms failed to do so. The RE-powered Cosmo Sport 110S was launched in 1967 as a result. Sadly, Matsuda fell ill and died in 1970.
 Shotaro Kamiya: Sales network specialist
Kamiya was born in 1898. After working abroad with trading companies, he took up a sales position at GM (Japan) in 1928, and duly moved to Toyota seven years later, where he was given the title of Sales Director. In 1950, Kamiya was made the first president of Toyota Motor Sales Ltd, setting up the sales channel system and driving schools, and establishing a new level of customer service. He died in 1980.  
 Genshichi Asahara: Car technology specialist
Born in 1891, Asahara was interested in chemistry first and foremost. He joined Yoshisuke Ayukawa's Tobato Casting firm, and moved across to Nissan in 1933. He became the latter's president in 1942, but resigned in wartime when production turned to military needs. He became an important figure within the GHQ advisory panel, and was the first chairman of the Japan Motor Technology Association. After becoming president of Nissan again in 1951, he also headed the Japan Motor Industry Federation (JMIF) for a while. He died in August 1970.  
 Masaichi Kondo: R & D pioneer
Born in 1908, after studying aeronautics, Kondo applied his knowledge to improve car and motorcycle stability in the post-war years. In 1968, he was named an honorary professor at the Tokyo Institute of Technology and also the Tokyo Agricultural Industry University. He died in February 1999. 
 Michihiro Nishida: Safety campaigner
Nishida was born in 1923, and joined Honda in 1950. He duly became Honda's MD in 1970, and headed the 'Safety Driving' campaign, which in turn led to the foundation of the International Transport Safety Society, bringing in ideas from all over the world to further improve conditions in Japan. 
 Yusuke Kaji: Advertising specialist
Born in 1931, Kaji was one of the co-founders of Nippon Design Center. For 40 years, Kaji handled Toyota's advertising campaigns, with his work becoming very influential in promotional circles.

2004 
 Carlos Ghosn: president of Nissan
Born in March 1954, Ghosn made his name with Michelin, allowing him to take up the position of VP at Renault in 1996. In June that year, he was announced COO of Nissan, and became president of the latter in 2000. His 'Nissan Revival Plan' helped turn the finances at Nissan around.  
 Tadashi Kume: president of Honda
Born in 1932, Kume joined Honda after completing his studies in mechanical engineering. He became a director at Honda's Technical Centre in 1969, and was appointed president of the latter in 1977. By 1983, he was president of Honda. He retired in 2002 with a glowing career, a Medal of Honor and several respected books behind him.
 Shozo Maeda: Car museum founder
Maeda made his name in bricks, but founded the Japan Motor Museum in November 1978, now hosting around 200,000 visitors a year.
 Tatsuo Hasegawa: Toyota development engineer
Born in 1916, Hasegawa joined the Tachikawa Aircraft Company after graduating from the Tokyo Imperial University. He moved to Toyota in 1946, and gained a good reputation in the field of aerodynamics. He was also involved in the development of the first generation Crown, and was appointed chief engineer on the first generation Corolla and first generation Celica/Carina projects. He was appointed Toyota's MD in 1978, retiring from the company in 1988.
 Mineo Yamamoto: Scholar/Doctor of Engineering
Born in 1903, Yamamoto studied aeronautics at Tokyo Imperial University. After the war, he used his extensive knowledge of aero-engines for motor vehicle applications, and also worked in the field of car body design, becoming a leading light in measuring body stress. He was a top professor, and receiving a medal for his work a few years before his death in 1979.  
 Shinroku Momose: Subaru development engineer
Born in 1919, Momose joined the Nakajima Aircraft Co. in 1942 after graduating from Tokyo Imperial University. He was quickly assigned to the Navy to research jet engine and turbocharger development, but returned to Nakajima after the war. He developed the Rabbit scooter, and was involved in all of the early Subaru road car projects – the most famous being the Subaru 360 minicar of 1958. Momose was made Executive Chief Engineer in 1968, and he remained close to the industry long after his retirement. He died in 1997.

2005 
 Yasusada Nobumoto: Auto parts specialist
Born in 1920, after a spell in the army, Nobumoto eventually joined the Akebono Brake concern in 1950. He was given an executive position there within a year, and became president in 1964. He moved into the chairman's office in 1990, and was also chairman of the Japan Parts Association for many years. He died in 2003.   
 Yoshio Nakamura: Honda development engineer
Born in 1918, Nakamura graduated from Tokyo Imperial University after studying aeronautical engineering. With the closure of the Nakajima Aircraft Co., he moved across to Fuji Sangyo, working on automotive engine design. He joined Honda in 1958, making his name in the R & D department and as a leading light in Honda's first venture into the world of F1. He retired in 1977, and died in December 1994. 
 Shinichiro Sakurai: Nissan development engineer
Born on April 3, 1929. After graduating from Yokohama National University, Sakurai joined Prince as a chassis engineer in 1952, and was heavily involved in the development of the first generation Skyline. He continued to head the Skyline project long after the Nissan takeover, and was appointed president of Autech (a Nissan subsidiary) in 1986. He died of heart failure on January 17, 2011.
 Kiyoshi Tomizuka: Two-stroke engine specialist
Born in 1893, Tomizuka studied mechanical engineering at Tokyo Imperial University. After a period of aeronautical research he went to Europe, and on his return to Japan in 1923, became a leading figure in two-stroke technology. He continued to lecture at various universities until 1966. He died at the age of 94.
 Heitatsu Igarashi: Motoring historian
Born in 1924, Igarashi joined Isuzu after studying mechanical engineering. After the war, he moved to the Ohta coachbuilding concern, but established his own design consultancy business in 1950, becoming a freelance writer and photographer at roughly the same time. The editor of Motor Review and a respected motoring historian, he died in December 2000.

2006 
 Nobuhiko Kawamoto: president of Honda
Born in 1936, Kawamoto studied precision engineering and joined Honda in 1963. He became heavily involved in automotive engine design and development and was an important member of the team that created the legendary CVCC unit. After several executive positions, he was named Honda's president in 1990, and continues to act as a consultant in his retirement years. He was awarded a KBE from Britain in 1999.
 Hirosuke Furusho: Safety specialist
Born in Kobe in 1932, Furusho joined Daihatsu in 1955. He was renowned for his work on driving stability, and moved up through the ranks at Daihatsu, becoming VP in 1996. He is an honorary member of the Motor Technology Federation.  
 Toshiro Seki: Diesel engine specialist
Born in 1908, Seki became involved in automobiles when the steel foundry he was working for established a car-building business. He became a professor at Waseda University, and was well respected for his work on diesel engines. He died in 1979 in an air accident over the South Pole.  
 Atsushi Watari: NVH specialist
Born in 1917, Watari graduated from Tokyo Imperial University in 1941, majoring in aeronautics. After a spell with the Nakajima Aircraft Co., he became a Doctor of Engineering, and then a professor at Tokyo University. Best known for his work on automotive springs and NVH control, he was heavily involved with JARI and FISITA before his retirement in 1978. He died in 1983, aged 66. 
 Yasusaburo Kobori: Airbag pioneer
Born in 1899, Kobori was largely self-taught. After a spell with the Osaka Electric Railway Co., he formed his own machinery business in 1937, which was duly incorporated into the Ishikawajima Heavy Industries business. In 1962, he moved to Tokyo and started work on an airbag system. He died in 1975, sadly too soon to see his invention gain worldwide acceptance.

2007 
 Taiichi Ohno: Manufacturing specialist
Ohno was born in February 1912, and after graduating from Nagoya Kogyo University, joining the Toyoda Spinning and Weaving company. He was transferred to that concern's Toyota car project, and established a wide range of manufacturing techniques, including the 'Just In Time' method that is still a widely used system in the motor industry to this day. He also improved machinery and brought about a number of quality control practices that gave Toyota an unrivaled reputation in the field. He ultimately became Toyota's VP in 1978, but died in 1990.     
 Kenichi Yamamoto: president of Mazda
Born in 1922, Yamamoto studied mechanical engineering at Tokyo Imperial University. He joined Toyo Kogyo (Mazda) just after the war and became heavily involved in automotive engine design. In April 1963, he headed the RE development team, dedicated to making the Wankel engine suitable for production, and eventually perfected this beautiful power-unit. He was named president of Mazda in 1984, and then chairman in 1987. He retired in 1992. 
 Takeshi Nakatsuka: R & D pioneer
Born in 1926, Nakatsuka joined Isuzu after graduating from university. He worked on powerplant and body engineering, and was duly appointed head of R & D in 1965. He became president of Shatai Kogyo Ltd in 1988, and was named chairman of Isuzu R & D in 1992.  
 Hachiro Ogihara: Tooling specialist
Born in 1906, Ogihara joined the Nakajima Aircraft Co. in 1921 and rose to the position of factory manager. However, when Japan's industry was reorganized following the war, he joined Fuji Sangyo (Subaru) for a short time before establishing the Ogihara Iron Works to create press dies. An early order from Subaru's bus department started things rolling, before Honda invested in the company. Ogihara died in 1983, but his company now supplies precision dies to car manufacturers all over the world.
 Fujio Uruno: Safety specialist
Born in 1917, Uruno became attached to the scientific department of the police force to study safety issues. A professor at Nihon University from 1969, he continued to work in the safety arena until his death in 1997.
 Kenshichiro Suzuki: Car test magazine pioneer
Born in 1903, Suzuki joined the staff of Motor Fan magazine pre-war, and became its publisher in a post-war revival of the title. The road test format was devised to give readers the ultimate level of information. Suzuki duly formed Sanai Shobo in 1952, giving birth to more motoring magazines. He died in 1963 but his legacy lives on.

2008 
 Yutaka Katayama: Influential president of Datsun in America
Born in 1909, Katayama graduated from Keio University and joined Nissan in 1935. He was responsible for the first Tokyo Motor Show in 1954, and founded Nissan's operations in America. His management style allowed the Datsun brand to flourish in the States until his return to Japan in 1977. He was inducted into the AHF in 1998.
 Jiro Tanaka: Respected Prince engineer  
Tanaka was born in Tokyo in 1917. He graduated from Tokyo Institute of Technology in 1939 and joined the Tachikawa Aircraft Co. soon after. In the same year, he was recruited to the Army as a Sergeant (he was promoted to 1st Lieutenant in February 1940) and was assigned to evaluate the new engines for the Army aircraft. In 1944, he was sent to his home company Tachikawa to complete the design of the Tachikawa Ki-74. Following the war, after the reorganization of various firms, he became a valued employee at Prince, moving up through the ranks to executive level. He became VP of Nissan Diesel in 1983, retiring six years later.

 Seiichi Inagawa: The man behind the first Suzuki Kei-car
Born in 1925, Inagawa joined Suzuki after the war, rising to an executive of the company in 1973. He has received numerous awards, including a medal from the Emperor in 1997.
 Katsumi Kageyama: Respected professor of engineering 
Kageyama was born in Kyushu in 1920, and graduated from Nippon University in 1943. He became a naval engineer, working on aero-engines, and then taught the subject at his old university, eventually becoming a professor in 1965. He wrote numerous books, and received an Emperor’s medal. He died in 2008, a few months before receiving this latest award.
 Michiko Miyasu: Safety specialist
Born in 1929, Miyasu joined the Marubeni trading company in 1946, before established her own shop five years later. In 1967, she set up a business that brought computer technology into the automotive world to enhance safety, and has since received many awards for her work.

Other entries 
In addition to the induction of men and women who have made outstanding contributions in the automotive field, JAHFA introduced annual awards for the best domestic car, import car, design, technology, and historic car. To date, the following vehicles and designs have been singled out for recognition:

2001 
 Best domestic car: Honda Fit; Toyota Estima Hybrid
 Best domestic design Toyota Camry; Nissan Primera

2002 
 Best domestic car: Mazda Atenza; Honda Accord
 Best domestic design: Toyota Ist; Nissan Cube

2003 
 Best domestic car: Mazda RX-8
 Best domestic design: Toyota Prius
 Best technology: Honda V6 engine
 Best import car: Volkswagen Touareg
 Best import design: Porsche Cayenne
 Historic car of Japan: Mazda Cosmo 110S

2004 
 Best domestic car: Toyota Crown/Majesta
 Best domestic design: Toyota Porte
 Best domestic technology: Honda Legend
 Best import car: Maserati Quattroporte
 Best import design: Audi A6
 Best import technology: Volkswagen Golf
 Historic car of Japan: Subaru 360

2005 
 Best domestic car: Honda Civic
 Best import car: Peugeot 407
 Best design: BMW 3 Series
 Best technology: Lexus GS430
 Historic car of Japan: Honda Civic

2006 
 Best domestic car: Lexus LS460
 Best import car: Alfa Romeo Brera
 Best design: Mitsubishi i
 Best technology: Audi TT Coupe
 Historic car of Japan: Toyota Crown

2007 
 Best domestic car: Honda Fit
 Best import car: Volkswagen Golf Variant
 Best design: Mazda Demio
 Best technology: Nissan Skyline
 Historic car of Japan: Daihatsu Midget

2008 
 Best domestic car: Toyota iQ
 Best import car: Audi A4
 Best design: Toyota iQ
 Best technology: Nissan X-Trail 20GT
 Historic car of Japan: Suzuki Suzulight

2009 
 Best domestic car: Honda Insight
 Best import car: VW Golf
 Best design: Toyota Prius
 Best technology: Mitsubishi i-MiEV

2010 
 Best domestic car: Honda Fit Hybrid
 Best import car: VW Polo
 Best design: Honda CR-Z
 Best technology: Subaru Legacy (EyeSight ver.2)

2011 
 Best domestic car: Nissan Leaf
 Best import car: VW Passat
 Best design: Nissan Leaf
 Best technology: Mazda Demio (SKYACTIV Technology)

2012 
 Best domestic car: Honda N BOX+
 Best import car: VW up!
 Best design: VW up!
 Best technology: Mazda CX-5 (SKYACTIV-D 2.2L)

External links
JAHFA official site 
JAHFA official site – Inductees viewable by year and image 

The information contained in this article is an English translation of the JAHFA yearbooks, printed in Japanese.

People in the automobile industry
Halls of fame in Japan
Motor vehicle halls of fame